WD repeat-containing protein 37 is a protein that in humans is encoded by the WDR37 gene.

This gene encodes a member of the WD repeat protein family. WD repeats are minimally conserved regions of approximately 40 amino acids typically bracketed by gly-his and trp-asp (GH-WD), which may facilitate formation of heterotrimeric or multiprotein complexes. Members of this family are involved in a variety of cellular processes, including cell cycle progression, signal transduction, apoptosis, and gene regulation.

Clinical

Mutations in this gene have been linked to a number of lesions in humans. These include

 Corneal opacity/Peters anomaly
 Coloboma
 Microcornea
 Cerebellar hypoplasia
 Epilepsy
 Dysmorphic facial features
 Variable skeletal, cardiac and genitourinary defects
 Significant neurological impairment with structural brain defects and seizures
 Poor feeding
 Poor post-natal growth 
 Death in infancy

References

Further reading